Richard "Richie" Ian Barker (born 30 May 1975) is an English former professional footballer. He is currently assistant head coach of EFL League One club Derby County.

He has previously managed Portsmouth, Bury and Crawley Town.

Playing career
Born in Sheffield, Barker began his career at Sheffield Wednesday, but only played in the Intertoto Cup for the first team. He was sold by the Owls in 1997 to Northern Irish side Linfield after loan spells at Doncaster and Ards, before returning home to play for Brighton & Hove Albion. He played two seasons at Brighton, scoring 12 goals, before moving to Macclesfield on a free transfer in 1999.

At Macclesfield, Barker scored 23 goals in 58 league games. He was signed by Rotherham United in January 2001, and helped the Millers gain promotion to the Championship. He was mostly used as a substitute by Rotherham, and was allowed to move to Mansfield Town on a free transfer in November 2004.

Barker soon became a fan favourite at Field Mill, scoring 10 goals in his first season at the club. In the summer of 2005, he was named team captain, and he led by example with his professionalism and work-rate. Barker was the Stags' top scorer in 2005–06 with a career-best 23 goals, including two goals against his old club Rotherham in the FA Cup first round.

In the summer of 2006, Barker signed a contract extension with Mansfield which tied him with the club until the end of the 2008–09 season. However, in January 2007 he was reluctantly forced to transfer to Hartlepool United during the January transfer window, much to the anger of the Stags fans.

He re-joined Rotherham United on 3 October 2008, on an emergency loan in January 2009. He scored on his second Millers debut in the 4–1 over Grimsby Town after coming off the bench. He made his move permanent on 1 January 2009. Due to a knee injury in January 2009, he decided to hang up his boots on 29 May 2009.

Managerial career

Bury
After joining Sheffield United, being part of the Academy, Barker was named the manager of Bury's youth team from July 2010. Barker became caretaker manager of Bury in April 2011 after Alan Knill left for Scunthorpe United with eight games left in the season. Barker led Bury to six consecutive victories and promotion to League One. He was named Football League Two Manager of the Month for April 2011. This successful spell led to him being appointed as Bury's permanent manager on 1 June 2011.

Crawley Town
Barker was appointed manager of Crawley Town on 7 August 2012.

On 27 November 2013, Crawley Town terminated Barker's contract with immediate effect. At the time of his dismissal Crawley had not won any of their last seven games, scoring just once in those games.

Portsmouth
On 9 December 2013, Portsmouth announced Barker as their new manager with Steve Coppell being appointed as director of football. Barker was sacked on 27 March 2014 after 20 games in charge. At the time of his dismissal Portsmouth had not won any of their last six games, scoring just once in those games.

Milton Keynes Dons
On 1 April 2014 Barker was appointed Assistant Manager at Milton Keynes Dons. This has initially been confirmed as being until the end of the 13/14 season. This has since been extended to a position as head of coaching for the forthcoming 2014/15 season.

On 23 October 2016, following the mutual-termination of the contract of manager Karl Robinson, Barker was announced as caretaker manager of the club whilst a replacement was sought.

On 20 December 2016, following the appointment of new manager Robbie Neilson early in the month, Milton Keynes Dons announced that Barker had left the club by mutual consent.

Charlton Athletic
On 21 December 2016, Barker joined League One side Charlton Athletic as a first-team coach, re-joining manager Karl Robinson having previously worked alongside him at Milton Keynes Dons. On 28 April 2017 the club announced he would be leaving at the end of the season.

Rotherham United
On 4 May 2017, Barker was appointed assistant manager of Rotherham United, following their relegation from the EFL Championship.

Personal life
He is the father of current Charlton Athletic player Charlie Barker.

Managerial statistics

Honours

Player
Hartlepool United
League Two runner-up: 2006–07

Individual
PFA Team of the Year: 1999–2000 Third Division

Manager
Bury
League Two runner-up: 2010–11

Individual
League Two Manager of the Month: April 2011

References

External links

Vital Hartlepool Profile: Richie Barker

1975 births
Living people
Footballers from Sheffield
English footballers
Association football forwards
Sheffield Wednesday F.C. players
Doncaster Rovers F.C. players
Ards F.C. players
Linfield F.C. players
Brighton & Hove Albion F.C. players
Macclesfield Town F.C. players
Rotherham United F.C. players
Mansfield Town F.C. players
Hartlepool United F.C. players
English Football League players
English football managers
Bury F.C. managers
Crawley Town F.C. managers
Portsmouth F.C. managers
English Football League managers
Milton Keynes Dons F.C. non-playing staff
Charlton Athletic F.C. non-playing staff
Rotherham United F.C. non-playing staff